Sophie Lewis (born 2002) is a British and English track cyclist.

Cycling career
Lewis became a British champion when winning the Omnium event at the 2022 British National Track Championships. In addition she won a silver medal in the madison event.

Major results
2022
 1st  Omnium, National Track Championships

References

2002 births
Living people
British female cyclists
British track cyclists
English track cyclists
English female cyclists
Cyclists at the 2022 Commonwealth Games
Commonwealth Games competitors for England
21st-century British women
Medallists at the 2022 Commonwealth Games
Commonwealth Games medallists in cycling
Commonwealth Games bronze medallists for England